Darius may refer to:

Persian royalty
Kings of the Achaemenid Empire
 Darius I (the Great, 550 to 487 BC)
 Darius II (423 to 404 BC)
 Darius III (Codomannus, 380 to 330 BC)

Crown princes
 Darius (son of Xerxes I), crown prince of Persia, may have ruled briefly in 465 BC
Darius, son of Artaxerxes II, crown prince and junior king of his father, father of Arbupales

Kings, princes, and politicians
 Darius (praetorian prefect), Praetorian prefect of the East in 436 to 437 AD
 Darius I of Media Atropatene
 Darius II of Persis
 Darius the Mede
 Darius of Pontus
 Dara Shikoh, known as Darius the Magnificent
 Darius, one of the sons of King Mithridates VI Eupator

Other
 Darius (album), by Graham Collier
 Darius (given name), including a list of people with the given name
Darius (surname)
 Darius (horse), a racehorse
 Darius Films
 Darius (video game), a side-scrolling shoot-'em-up by Taito, originally released for the arcades in 1987

See also
 Dharius, Mexican rapper
 Daria (name), a feminine given name
 Dario (disambiguation), counterpart of Darius in Persian, Italian, Spanish, Portuguese and Croatian
 Daris, a masculine given name
 Daria (disambiguation)
 Darius II (disambiguation)